Rixty was an alternative payment system that let domestic and international users spend cash and coins for online games and digital content.

Rixty was a subsidiary of MOL AccessPortal Sdn Bhd (MOL) which was one of Asia's leading payment service providers.

History
Rixty, Inc. was founded in September 2007 and is headquartered in San Francisco, California.

Rixty announced a majority investment by MOL Global in 2012.

In 2019, The Rixty website has now been replaced by Razer Gold. Users who try visiting the website will get a message saying that they upgraded from Rixty to Razer Gold

References

External links

 Official site

Digital currencies